Robert Lin Woon Fui (born March 31, 1983) is a former Malaysian national badminton player. He came fifth at the 2006 IBF World Championships – Men's doubles with his partner Mohd Fairuzizuan Mohd Tazari. Lin works as a player-coach at the AirAsia Badminton Academy.  In July 8, 2022, Lin was charged in the Sessions Court Shah Alam, Malaysia with two counts of cheating. The charge, framed under Section 420 of the Penal Code for cheating and dishonestly inducing delivery of property, carry a sentence of up to 10 years jail, whipping and a fine, upon conviction.

Early life 

Lin was born in Kepong, Malaysia. He was the second child of Lin Yuet Ming and Chin Nyok Chin. Lin's love for the sport developed while accompanying his father to badminton sessions at age six. Though he loved playing the drums, he opted for badminton and became school champion when he was nine.

Four years later, Lin joined the Badminton Association of Malaysia academy following the guidance of Selangor state coach Moe Chin Kiat. When he turned 17, the coaches at the BAM academy, including Malaysian shuttler Cheah Soon Kit saw his potential in doubles and directed him accordingly.

Career

2002 - 2006 
In 2002, Lin was promoted to the Malaysian national back-up squad where he began his partnership with Fairuzizuan. Two years later, the pair broke through at the 2004 Badminton Asia Championships where they landed their first title. They won the Malaysian National Circuit Grand Prix Finals a year later, upsetting favourites Chan Chong Ming-Koo Kien Keat in the finals on December 15.

Their numerous victories over legendary Chinese badminton duo Cai Yun/Fu Haifeng rank among their favourite moments. On January 19, 2006, they thrashed the defending champions 15-3, 15-6 in the All-England Open. The pair reached the semi-finals.

That same year, they reached the Malaysian Open finals. Lin and Fairuzizan again defeated Cai Yun-Fu Haifeng at the 2006 Badminton Asia Championships where they won 21-15, 13-21, 21-17.

The Malaysians were dubbed the “Chinese men's doubles killer” as they defeated Guo Zhendong and Xie Zhongbo in the 2006 Badminton World Federation World Championships in Madrid. They won 15-21, 21-16, 21-14.

Following numerous victories, Lin and Fairuzizuan's career stagnated and they split up in March 2007. Before their split, they helped Malaysia win the team bronze medal at the 2006 Asian Games, winning two of their three matches.

2007 
Lin then partnered with Gan Teik Chai. Though the partnership took time to bear fruit, they won two bronze medals at the 2007 SEA Games in the men's doubles and team events.

They faced their former partners Fairuzizuan and Mohd Zakry Abdul Latif at the Singapore Super Series  final in June 2008.

2008 
Lin partnered briefly with youngster Goh V Shem with whom he won the 2008 Malaysia International Challenge, defeating  Ong Jian Guo-Gan Teik Chai 21-19, 21-18.

2009 - 2010 
In 2009, Lin became the head coach of the AirAsia Badminton Academy. He occasionally competed in tournaments.

While with AirAsia he continued to mentor V Shem, partnering with him from October 2009 to January 2010 while also pairing with Thien How Hoon.

Under Lin's tutelage, Shem formed a formidable partnership with Tan Wee Kiong, winning a silver medal at the 2014 Commonwealth Games and 2016 Olympic Games.

2011 - 
Lin took a few years off to concentrate on his coaching career before returning to competitive action. Partnered with his best friend Lee Yan Sheng, he reached the man draw for the Osaka International Challenge in 2013 and the Smiling Fish Thailand International Series.

Lin played in the inaugural Purple League for the Johor-based Nusajaya Badminton Club, and coached several Hong Kong celebrities and prominent Malaysians in his spare time.

Personal life
He married squash international Delia Arnold.

Achievements

World Cup 
Men's doubles

Southeast Asian Games 
Men's doubles

IBF World Grand Prix/BWF Super Series 
Men's doubles

  BWF Superseries tournament
 IBF World Grand Prix tournament

References 

Malaysian male badminton players
1983 births
Living people
Malaysian sportspeople of Chinese descent
Badminton players at the 2006 Asian Games
Asian Games bronze medalists for Malaysia
Asian Games medalists in badminton
Medalists at the 2006 Asian Games
Sportspeople from Kuala Lumpur
Southeast Asian Games bronze medalists for Malaysia
Southeast Asian Games medalists in badminton
Competitors at the 2007 Southeast Asian Games